Herrickia kingii  is a North American species of flowering plants in the family Asteraceae, called the King's serpentweed or King's aster. It has been found only in the State of Utah in the western United States.

Herrickia kingii is a small perennial herb rarely more than 12 centimeters (2.8 inches) tall from a woody underground caudex. The plant produces flower heads in groups of 1-5 heads. Each head contains 13-27 white or lavender ray florets surrounding 29–47 yellow disc florets.

References

Astereae
Flora of Utah
Plants described in 1871
Flora without expected TNC conservation status